Bellever Tor is a granite tor in the centre of Dartmoor, England. It provides panoramic 360 degree views and is located near Bellever Forest and the popular village of Bellever. There are numerous Kists and Cairn Circles on its slopes.

References

Dartmoor
Tors of Dartmoor